Kam Tin is one of the 39 constituencies in the Yuen Long District of Hong Kong.

The constituency returns one district councillor to the Yuen Long District Council, with an election every four years. Kam Tin constituency is loosely based on Kam Tin with estimated population of 20,792.

Councillors represented

Election results

2010s

References

Kam Tin
Constituencies of Hong Kong
Constituencies of Yuen Long District Council
1985 establishments in Hong Kong
Constituencies established in 1985